The 1941–42 SK Rapid Wien season was the 44th season in club history.

Squad

Squad and statistics

Squad statistics

Fixtures and results

Gauliga

Tschammerpokal

References

1941-42 Rapid Wien Season
Rapid